Shem is a biblical character, one of the sons of Noah.

Shem may also refer to:
Shem (given name)
Shem (surname)
 Shem (Conan), a nation in the fictional world of Conan the Barbarian
 Shem HaMephorash, a name of God in the Kabbalah
 "Hawks over Shem", a 1955 Conan the Barbarian novelette by L. Sprague de Camp
 Baal Shem, historical Jewish occupation, a healer and exorcist using Kabbalistic methods
 House of Shem, New Zealand reggae band that debuted in 2008
 Ohel Shem, Israeli high school in Ramat Gan
 Paraphrase of Shem, apocryphal Gnostic writing
 A nickname for Przemek Karnowski (born 1993), Polish basketball player